Ines, and variants, is a feminine given name related to Agnes.

Used alone it may refer to:
Saint Ines (Agnes of Rome; c. 291 – c. 304), virgin–martyr, saint
Ines (Eda-Ines Etti; born 1981), Estonian singer

As a first name
Inés Alberdi (born 1948), Spanish sociologist
Inés Ayala (born 1957), Spanish politician
Inés Arrondo (born 1977), Argentine field hockey player
Ines Aru (born 1939), Estonian actress
Inês de Castro (1325–1355), Galician noblewoman, wife of King Peter I of Portugal
Inés Coronel Barreras (b. 1968), a male Mexican drug trafficker
Ines Diers (born 1963), German swimmer
Inés Echeverría (1868–1949), Chilean writer
Inés Efron (born 1985), Argentine actress
Inés Ferrer Suárez (born 1990), Spanish tennis player
Inès de La Fressange (born 1957), French model and fashion designer
Inés García de Durán (born 1928), Colombian folklorist
Inés Gaviria (born 1979), Colombian singer
Ines Geißler (born 1963), German swimmer
Inés González Árraga (born 1973), Venezuelan political prisoner
Inés Gorrochategui (born 1973), Argentine tennis player
Inés de Guerrico Eguses (Sor María Jacinta; 1793-1840), Argentine nun, writer
Ines Eichmüller (born 1980), German politician
Inês Henriques (born 1980), Portuguese race walker
Inès Ligron (born 1962), French fashion and beauty expert
Ines Maričić (born 1988), Croatian 9 pin bowling player 
Inés Melchor (born 1986), Peruvian long-distance runner
Inés Mendoza (1908–1990), Puerto Rican teacher, writer and socialite, the First Lady
Inés Molina, Argentine actress
Inês Monteiro (born 1980), Portuguese runner
Ines Müller (born 1959), German shot putter
Inés Palombo (born 1985), Argentine actress and model
Ines Paulke (1958–2010), German singer
Ines Pellegrini (born 1954), Eritrean-Italian actress
Ines Putri (born 1989), Indonesian beauty pageant
Inés Remersaro (born 1992), Uruguayan swimmer
Inés Rivero (born 1975), Argentine model
Inés Rodena (1905–1985), Cuban radio and television writer
Inés Sainz (born c. 1978), Mexican journalist
Inés Sastre (born 1973), Spanish model and actress
Inés de Suárez (c. 1507–1580), Spanish conquistadora
Ines Torelli (born 1931), Swiss comedian, radio personality, and stage, voice and film actress
Inés de la Torre (fl. 1618), Spanish courtier
Ines Uusmann (born 1948), Swedish politician

As a middle name
María Inés (María Inés Guerra Núñez; born 1983), Mexican TV-hostess, actress and singer
Sor Juana Inés de la Cruz, O.S.H.(12 November 1651 – 17 April 1695) New Spain (current Mexico)  nun and poet

See also
 Ines (disambiguation)
 Inez

Estonian feminine given names
Spanish feminine given names
Swedish feminine given names